= Boaz Mountain =

Mountain in Oregon, United States

Coordinates: 42°07′57″N 123°02′42″W

Boaz Mountain is a summit in the U.S. state of Oregon. The elevation is 3,497 feet (1,066 m).

Boaz Mountain was named in 1879 after Kinder Boaz, a pioneer citizen.
